In 2019, there were 26 new This American Life episodes.

Air Date: 2019-01-04

Air Date: 2019-01-18

Air Date: 2019-02-01

Air Date: 2019-02-15

Air Date: 2019-03-01

Air Date: 2019-03-15

Air Date: 2019-03-29

Air Date: 2019-04-05

Air Date: 2019-04-19

Air Date: 2019-05-10

Air Date: 2019-05-17

Air Date: 2019-05-31

Air Date: 2019-06-14

Air Date: 2019-07-05

Air Date: 2019-07-12

Air Date: 2019-07-26

Air Date: 2019-08-16

Air Date: 2019-08-23

Air Date: 2019-09-20

Air Date: 2019-09-27

Air Date: 2019-10-11
Extra: "Drums, Oil, and Early Morning Devil Horns"
Air Date: 2019-10-11

Air Date: 2019-10-18

Air Date: 2019-11-08

Air Date: 2019-11-15

Air Date: 2019-12-06

Air Date: 2019-12-27

References

External links
This American Lifes radio archive for 2019

2019
This American Life
This American Life